Eduardo Renato Vio Grossi (17 November 1944 – 3 December 2022) was a Chilean lawyer and judge. He served on the Inter-American Court of Human Rights from 2010 to 2021.

Vio died on 3 December 2022, at the age of 78.

References

1944 births
2022 deaths
Chilean lawyers
International law scholars
Inter-American Court of Human Rights judges
Pontifical Catholic University of Valparaíso alumni
People from Valparaíso